The 1986 World Junior Curling Championships were held from March 16 to 22 at the Dartmouth Sportsplex in Dartmouth, Nova Scotia, Canada. The tournament only consisted of a men's event.

Teams

Round robin

  Teams to playoffs
  Teams to tiebreaker for 3rd place
  Teams to tiebreaker for 4th place

Tiebreaker
For 3rd place

For 4th place

Playoffs

Final standings

Awards
 WJCC Sportsmanship Award:  David Aitken

All-Star Team:
Skip:  Kevin Martin
Third:  Rick Feeney
Second:  Peter Smith
Lead:  Harry Reilly

References

External links

1986 in Nova Scotia
Curling in Nova Scotia
World Junior Curling Championships
Sport in Dartmouth, Nova Scotia
International curling competitions hosted by Canada
March 1986 sports events in Canada
1986 in youth sport
1986 in Canadian curling